People named Curbishley:

Alan Curbishley, football manager
Allison Curbishley, athlete
Bill Curbishley, music producer

See also
 Colin Corbishley (1939–2015), English footballer